Football Club de Morangis-Chilly is a football club located in Morangis, France. They play in the Régional 2, the seventh tier of French football.

The furthest Morangis-Chilly has gone in the Coupe de France is the round of 64, which they reached in the 1976–77 edition of the tournament, losing 3–1 to first-tier Lens.

Notable former players 
  Jean-Claude Fernandes
  Eddy Gnahoré
  Mario Mongelli
  Stéphane Persol
  Jean-Marc Pilorget
  Hakim Chabi

References

External links 

 Club website
FC Morangis Chilly at WorldFootball.net
Football clubs in France
Sport in Essonne
Football clubs in Île-de-France